John Armfield (1797–1871) was an American slave trader. He was the co-founder of Franklin & Armfield, "the largest slave trading firm" in the United States. He was also the developer of Beersheba Springs, and a co-founder of Sewanee: The University of the South.

Early life
John Armfield was born in 1797 in North Carolina to Quaker parents. He was of English descent.

Career

Armfield took up slave trading in the 1820s. For example, he sold a slave in Natchez, Mississippi, in 1827. In 1828, Armfield and his uncle by marriage, Isaac Franklin, formed the partnership of Franklin & Armfield to buy slaves in the mid-Atlantic states (Virginia, Maryland, Delaware, and the District of Columbia) and re-sell them in the newly opened territories of the Deep South. They were enormously successful and became two of the wealthiest men in the country. Franklin and Armfield joked with each other in letters about the enslaved women they were raping. They dissolved the partnership in 1835 and sold the business to one of their agents, George Kephart. Armfield retired to Central Tennessee in 1835.

Armfield settled Gruetli, a Swiss settlement in Grundy County, Tennessee. In 1855, he  also developed the resort for the wealthy of Beersheba Springs in Grundy County, Tennessee, which still exists. Additionally, he was the biggest single donor in the founding of Sewanee: The University of the South.

Personal life and death
Armfield married Martha Franklin, Isaac Franklin's niece, in 1831. Armfield joined the Episcopal Church, and his wife converted from the Presbyterian faith to Episcopalianism for him. The family attended Christ Church Cathedral in Nashville, Tennessee, as did Bishop Leonidas Polk, with whom Armfield was a close friend. Another one of Armfield's close friends was John M. Bass, the mayor of Nashville.

Armfield died of old age on September 20, 1871, in Beersheba Springs.

Armfield and his wife had no children. He fathered at least one child with an enslaved Black woman; he sold both her and the child. Rodney G. Williams has established his descent by DNA testing.

See also
Slavery in the United States#Slave trade

References

Further reading
 
 
 

1797 births
1871 deaths
American people of English descent
American slave traders
People from North Carolina
People from Grundy County, Tennessee
Sewanee: The University of the South people
19th-century American businesspeople
American slave owners